The Astroparticle and Cosmology (APC) laboratory in Paris gathers researchers (experimentalists, theorists and observers) working in different areas including high-energy astrophysics, cosmology, gravitation, and neutrino physics.

The institute was founded in January 2005  and soon moved to new campus of Paris Diderot University in the Paris Rive Gauche area.

The laboratory is a "Mixed Research Unit" in French terminology, funded by Paris Diderot University, the Centre national de la recherche scientifique (represented by three of its Institutes: mainly IN2P3, but also INSU and INP), the Commissariat à l'énergie atomique et aux énergies alternatives, and the Paris Observatory.

The first director of the laboratory was Pierre Binetruy (2005-2013). From January 2014 until December 2017 the director was Stavros Katsanevas, followed by Sotiris Loucatos, and Antoine Kouchner (since July 2018).

Research activities

Cosmology 
This group, headed by Kenneth Ganga, includes two main areas of research:
 Experimental investigation of the cosmic microwave background, including attempts to detect CMB polarization B-modes, which could provide support for the theory of Inflation. Researchers were involved in the Planck space mission and are now active in the QUBIC experiment, the Simons Observatory, and the LiteBIRD satellite. 
 Cosmological analysis of large spectroscopic and imaging surveys for the determination of constraints on the nature of dark energy. Researchers are involved in the wide-field observatories aimed at understanding the nature of dark energy: the large field Baryon Oscillation Spectroscopic Survey telescope, the Vera C. Rubin Observatory and the Euclid space mission

High-energy astrophysics
Research carried out by this group, headed by Anne Lemière, aims at understanding the violent phenomena of the universe (mostly within compact stars, neutron stars, or black holes). The group is engaged in many international projects with telescopes or instruments detecting photons, cosmic rays, or neutrinos. For the observation of
 gamma rays, it is involved in the INTEGRAL observatory, the High Energy Stereoscopic System, the Cherenkov Telescope Array, and the Space Variable Objects Monitor
 cosmic rays of ultra-high energy, it is involved in JEM-EUSO
 neutrinos, it is involved in the ANTARES and KM3NeT projects collaborations
 X-rays, it was involved in the space mission Hitomi

Neutrinos
The research carried out by this group, headed by Davide Franco, is dedicated to understanding neutrino properties is one of the laboratories' main activities. Researchers are involved in studies of the phenomenon of oscillation (Borexino, Double Chooz) and on future projects addressing the measurement of the neutrino mass hierarchy with atmospheric neutrinos with the deep-sea water Cherenkov telescope Orca and the long-baseline neutrino oscillation project Laguna-LBNO.

Gravitation 

This core research of this group led by Stanislav Babak is the direct detection of gravitational waves. The group is involved in both ground-based (Virgo interferometer) and space-based (Laser Interferometer Space Antenna and its precursor LISA Pathfinder) instruments.

Theory 
This group, headed by Dmitri Semikoz, covers the research topics of the laboratory from a theoretical perspective. It also carries out work on other areas of fundamental physics.

Organization 
The staff of the laboratory consists of 75 permanent researchers and over 60 engineers, technicians, and administrative personnel, plus about 125 non-permanent employees (PhD students, postdoctoral fellows, visitors). In addition, the Paris Center for Cosmological Physics directed by George Smoot is also part of the laboratory and one of the three functional centres of the Astroparticle Physics European Consortium is based here.

An "International Associated Laboratory" in astroparticle physics was launched in September 2007. It associates the APC laboratory with the Kavli Institute for Particle Astrophysics and Cosmology (Stanford University).

Evaluation
The laboratory has been evaluated twice by the AERES: in 2008 and in 2013. In the latter evaluation, the lab won excellent scores (A or A+ in all criteria).

Astroparticle Physics European Consortium 
Astroparticle Physics European Consortium (APPEC) is a consortium of organizations from European countries that coordinate and fund research in astroparticle physics.

References

External links

List of publications by members of the lab

Research institutes in France
French National Centre for Scientific Research
2005 establishments in France